Intellectual Property is a 2006 film starring Christopher Masterson and Lyndsy Fonseca, with Bryan Cranston. It was written, produced, and directed by Nicholas Peterson.

Awards
The film won multiple awards:
Best Actor, Christopher Masterson, Oxford International Film Festival
Best Cinematography, Australian International Film Festival
Best Director, Oxford International Film Festival
Best Film, Oxford International Film Festival
Grand Jury Prize, Best Film, DC Independent Film Festival

References

External links 

 

American independent films
2000s thriller films
2006 films
2000s English-language films
2000s American films